Gaëtan Courtet (born 22 February 1989) is a French professional footballer who plays as a striker for  club Guingamp.

Career
Following his first campaign with Reims, Courtet was diagnosed with cancer. After successfully undergoing treatment during the summer, he joined the team for the 2011–12 season making his long-awaited return on 16 September 2011 in a 3–2 defeat to Laval.

In July 2019, Courtet joined Ajaccio on loan for the season.

On 11 August 2022, Courtet signed with Guingamp for two years.

References

External links
 
 
 

1989 births
Living people
French footballers
Footballers from Brittany
Sportspeople from Lorient
Association football forwards
Championnat National 2 players
Ligue 1 players
Ligue 2 players
Championnat National 3 players
FC Lorient players
Stade de Reims players
Stade Brestois 29 players
AJ Auxerre players
AC Ajaccio players
En Avant Guingamp players